The second season of the television comedy series Boy Meets World aired between September 23, 1994 and May 19, 1995, on ABC in the United States. The season was produced by Michael Jacobs Productions and Touchstone Television with series creator Michael Jacobs as executive producer. It was broadcast as part of the ABC comedy block TGIF on Friday evenings. This is the last season to have Lily Nicksay portray Morgan Matthews.  (She would be replaced by Lindsay Ridgeway in season three.)

Cast

Main 

Ben Savage as Cory Matthews
William Daniels as George Feeny 
Betsy Randle as Amy Matthews
Will Friedle as Eric Matthews
Rider Strong as Shawn Hunter
Danielle Fishel as Topanga Lawrence 
Lily Nicksay as Morgan Matthews
Anthony Tyler Quinn as Jonathan Turner 
William Russ as Alan Matthews

Episodes

References

External links
 

1994 American television seasons
1995 American television seasons
2